Portmagee is a village in County Kerry, Ireland. The village is located on the Iveragh peninsula south of Valentia Island, and is known locally as 'the ferry', in reference to its purpose as a crossing point to the island. Access to Valentia Island is now via the Maurice O'Neill Memorial Bridge (R565 road) from Portmagee, which was built in 1970 and named in memory of a member of the IRA executed in 1942 for his part in the shooting dead of Detective George Mordaunt in Dublin.

Name
The name Portmagee (Port Magee and Magee's Port as it was formerly known) comes from Captain Theobald Magee, a notorious 18th-century smuggler.  Having served in the army of King James as an officer, Magee 'retired' to a life of merchant shipping between France, Portugal and Ireland.  Thanks to the many inlets around the South West coast, his trade in contraband spirits, textiles and tea and tobacco was hard to police and therefore very profitable. He married Bridget Morgell, the widow of a rich Dingle merchant and also the daughter of the then representative for Dingle, Thomas Crosbie. 
There is some suspicion that Magee's death in a Lisbon monastery was due to some exile imposed by the powerful MP. However, his wife and sons continued the family business of smuggling.

Tourism
In December 2012, Portmagee was awarded the Fáilte Ireland National Tourism Town Award, the first town to be awarded the accolade.

Places of interest

The village serves as a departure point for tourists travelling to visit 'Skellig Michael', an island off the coast featuring a 6th-century monastic settlement. Skellig Michael (from Sceilig Mhichíl in the Irish language, meaning Michael's rock), also known as Great Skellig, is a steep rocky island in the Atlantic Ocean about 9 miles (14.5 kilometres) from the coast of County Kerry. It is the larger of the two Skellig Islands. Probably founded in the 7th century, for 600 years the island was a centre of monastic life for Irish Christian monks. The Gaelic monastery, which is situated almost at the summit of the 230-metre-high rock became a UNESCO World Heritage Site in 1996.  It is one of Europe's better known but least accessible monastic sites.
Since the extreme remoteness of Skellig Michael has until recently discouraged visitors, the site is exceptionally well preserved. The very spartan conditions inside the monastery illustrate the ascetic lifestyle practiced by early Irish Christians. The monks lived in stone 'beehive' huts (clochans), perched above nearly vertical cliff walls.

Another monastery, Illaunloughan, is located in the Portmagee Channel north of the town.

Skellig Rangers 
The local GAA team, Skellig Rangers, was founded in 1895 (originally as Portmagee G.A.A, before adopting its present name in the 1930s), and plays at Pairc Chill Imeallach in Portmagee.

See also
 List of towns and villages in Ireland

References

External links 

Portmagee and Skelligs Coast Tourism Guide
Portmagee Local Area Plan
 Portmagee Info and Map
 Poem by Brendan O'Neill -  Landing Mackerel on the Pier Head at Portmagee

Towns and villages in County Kerry
Iveragh Peninsula